The 2020 NASCAR Whelen Modified Tour was the thirty-sixth season of the Whelen Modified Tour (NWMT), a stock car racing tour sanctioned by NASCAR. It began with the Wade Cole Memorial 133 at Jennerstown Speedway on June 21 and concluded at Thompson Speedway Motorsports Park on October 11. Justin Bonsignore won the championship, his second.

Schedule 
On November 5, 2019, NASCAR announced the 2020 Whelen Modified Tour schedule. Among the 17 races was an inaugural stop at Iowa Speedway and returns to Jennerstown Speedway Complex and Martinsville Speedway. Due to the COVID-19 pandemic, however, the Martinsville date was cancelled, and many of the early-season races were postponed. An initial version of a revised schedule had Myrtle Beach Speedway hosting the season-opening race on June 6, but that date was eventually moved to Jennerstown and rescheduled for June 21. Two events at White Mountain Motorsports Park and an event at Monadnock Speedway were also added to the revised schedule. Oswego Speedway announced the cancellation of their September race in August in the face of tight state restrictions on gatherings.

Due to the COVID-19 pandemic, the WMT ran on tracks that are not NASCAR-sanctioned such as White Mountain Motorsports Park and Thompson Speedway Motorsports Park.

* The Thompson 150 was delayed from September 2 to September 3 due to inclement weather.

Results and standings

Race results

Point standings

After the conclusion of the season. Source:

 Justin Bonsignore – 392
 Jon McKennedy – 352
 Doug Coby – 347
 Craig Lutz – 342
 Ron Silk – 311
 Matt Swanson – 301
 Dave Sapienza – 292
 Calvin Carroll – 290
 Tyler Rypkema – 283
 Anthony Nocella – 282

See also
 2020 NASCAR Cup Series
 2020 NASCAR Xfinity Series
 2020 NASCAR Gander RV & Outdoors Truck Series
 2020 ARCA Menards Series
 2020 ARCA Menards Series East
 2020 ARCA Menards Series West
 2020 NASCAR Pinty's Series
 2020 NASCAR Whelen Euro Series
 2020 eNASCAR iRacing Pro Invitational Series
 2020 EuroNASCAR Esports Series

References

Whelen Modified Tour